Antonio Urdinarán (30 October 1898 – 8 June 1961) was a Uruguayan footballer.

He was a member of four Copa América squads, and was part of the winning squad on three occasions (1916, 1917 & 1920). He was a member of the Uruguay national team that won the gold medal in the 1924 Olympic football tournament, but he did not play in any matches.

References

External links
 profile

1898 births
1961 deaths
Uruguayan people of Basque descent
Uruguayan footballers
Footballers at the 1924 Summer Olympics
Olympic footballers of Uruguay
Olympic gold medalists for Uruguay
Uruguay international footballers
Defensor Sporting players
Club Nacional de Football players
Olympic medalists in football
Copa América-winning players
Medalists at the 1924 Summer Olympics

Association football defenders